In geology and related fields, a stratum (: strata) is a layer of rock or sediment characterized by certain lithologic properties or attributes that distinguish it from adjacent layers from which it is separated by visible surfaces known as either bedding surfaces or bedding planes. Prior to the publication of the International Stratigraphic Guide, older publications have defined a stratum as either being either equivalent to a single bed or composed of a number of beds; as a layer greater than 1 cm in thickness and constituting a part of a bed; or a general term that includes both bed and lamina.

Characteristics
 

Typically, a stratum is generally one of a number of parallel layers that lie one upon another to form enormous thicknesses of strata. The bedding surfaces (bedding planes) that separate strata represent episodic breaks in deposition associated either with periodic erosion, cessation of deposition, or some combination of the two. Stacked together with other strata, individual stratum can form composite stratigraphic units that can extend over hundreds of thousands of square kilometers of the Earth's surface. Individual stratum can cover similarly large areas. Strata are typically seen as bands of different colored or differently structured material exposed in cliffs, road cuts, quarries, and river banks. Individual bands may vary in thickness from a few millimeters to several meters or more. A band may represent a specific mode of deposition: river silt, beach sand, coal swamp, sand dune, lava bed, etc.

Types of stratum
In the study of rock and sediment strata, geologists have recognized a number of different types of strata, including bed, flow, band, and key bed. A bed is a single stratum that is lithologically distinguishable from other layers above and below it. In the classification hierarchy of sedimentary lithostratigraphic units, a bed is the smallest formal unit. However, only beds that are distinctive enough to be useful for stratigraphic correlation and geologic mapping are customnarily given formal names and considered formal lithostratigraphic units. The volcanic equivalent of a bed, a flow, is a discrete extrusive volcanic stratum or body distinguishable by texture, composition, or other objective criteria. As in case of a bed, a flow should only be designated and named as a formal lithostratigraphic units when it is distinctive, widespread, and useful for stratigraphic correlation. A band is a thin stratum that is distingushiable by a distinctive lithology or color and is useful in correlating strata. Finally, a key bed, also called a marker bed, is a well-defined, easily identifiable stratum or body of strata that has sufficiently distinctive characteristics, such as lithology or fossil content, to be recognized and correlated during geologic field or subsurface mapping.

Gallery

See also
 Archaeological horizon
 Bed (geology)
 Geological formation
 List of rock formations
 Geologic map
 Geologic unit
 Lamination (geology)
 Law of superposition

References

External links

GeoWhen Database

Methods in archaeology